Eastern Goldfields Regional Prison is an Australian prison located in South Boulder, Western Australia.

Foundation 
It replaced the Kalgoorlie Regional Prison in December 1980. The old prison was retained as an annexe to the new prison for three years to hold maximum and medium-security prisoners on a short-term basis. It was closed down permanently with the opening of a maximum-security remand block at the new prison in 1983.

In April 2005, the prison opened the Mount Morgans work camp, which allows approved low-risk prisoners to live, care for themselves and work under supervision in the area. The Mount Morgans work camp was closed in 2011 and 2 months later the brand new Warburton work camp was opened.

A variety of employment and educational activities are available to prisoners. An education officer and tutors provide a range of education activities/courses from basic numeracy and literacy to university subjects. Courses are provided specifically for Aboriginal prisoners. Training is also conducted in a number of trades with formal accreditation gained on completion.

References
 Corrective Services - Eastern Goldfields Regional Prison

Prisons in Western Australia
1980 establishments in Australia